Dakshineswar Kali Temple is a Hindu navaratna temple in Dakshineswar, Kolkata, West Bengal, India. Situated on the eastern bank of the Hooghly River, the presiding deity of the temple is Bhavatarini, a form of Parashakti Adya Kali, otherwise known as Adishakti Kalika. The temple was built in 1855 by Rani Rashmoni, a Zamindar, philanthropist and a devotee of Kali. The temple is known for its association with Ramakrishna and Ma Sarada Devi, mystics of 19th century Bengal.

The main temple was inspired by Navaratna style Radhakanta temple, built by Ramnath Mondal of Tollygunge. The temple compound, apart from the nine-spired main temple, contains a large courtyard surrounding the temple, with rooms along the boundary walls. There are twelve shrines dedicated to Shiva–Kali's consort–along the riverfront, a temple to Radha–Krishna, a bathing ghat on the river, a shrine dedicated to Rani Rashmoni. 'Nahabat', the chamber in the northwestern corner just beyond the last of the Shiva temples, is where Ramakrishna and Maa Sarada spent a considerable part of their lives.

History

The Dakshineswar Kali Temple was founded around the middle of the 19th century by Rani Rashmoni. Rani Rashmoni was a Mahishya by caste and was well known for her philanthropic activities. In the year 1847, Rashmoni prepared to go upon a long pilgrimage to the sacred Hindu city of Kashi to express her devotions to the Divine Mother. Rani was to travel in twenty-four boats, carrying relatives, servants, and supplies. According to traditional accounts, the night before the pilgrimage began, Rashmoni had a vision of the Divine Mother goddess Kali in a dream and reportedly said,

Profoundly affected by the dream, Rani immediately looked for and purchased a 30,000-acre plot in the village of Dakshineswar. The large temple complex was built between 1847 and 1855. The  plot was bought from an Englishman, Jake Hastie, and was then popularly known as Saheban Bagicha. Partly old Muslim burial ground shaped like a tortoise, considered befitting for the worship of Shakti according to Tantra traditions, it took eight years and nine hundred thousand rupees to complete the construction. The idol of Goddess Kali was installed on the Snana Yatra day on 31 May 1855 amid festivities at the temple formerly known as Sri Sri Jagadishwari Kali, with Ramkumar Chhattopadhyay as the head priest. Soon his younger brother Gadai or Gadadhar (later known as Ramakrishna) moved in and so did his nephew Hriday to assist him. On 31 May 1855 more than 1 lakh (one hundred thousand) Brahmins were invited from different parts of the country to grace the auspicious occasion. The next year, Ramkumar Chattopadhyay died, and the position was given to Ramakrishna. His wife, Sarada Devi, stayed in the south side of the Nahabat (music room) in a small room on the ground floor, which is now a shrine dedicated to her. Ramakrishnana was responsible for bringing much in the way of both fame and pilgrims to the temple.

Rani Rashmoni lived for only five years and nine months after the inauguration of the temple. She fell seriously ill in 1861. Realizing that her death was near, she decided to hand over the property she had purchased in Dinajpur (now in Bangladesh) as a legacy for the maintenance of the temple to the temple trust. She accomplished her task on 18 February 1861 and died on the next day. After her death, her sons-in-law took to celebrating Durga Puja in their respective premises.

Architecture

The garbha griha (sanctum sanctorum) houses an idol of goddess Kali, known as Bhavatarini, standing on the chest of a supine Shiva, and the two idols are placed on a thousand-petaled lotus throne made of silver.

Close to the main temple are the row of twelve identical Shiva temples built facing the east in the typical aat-chala Bengal architecture, they are built on either side of the ghat on the Hooghly river. To the North east of the Temple Complex is the Vishnu Temple or the Radha Kanta Temple. A flight of steps lead to the columned verandah and into the temple where a silver throne rests with a  idol of Lord Krishna and a  idol of Radha.

Gallery

See also
Kali Bari, Shimla
Belur Math
Kalighat Kali Temple
Dakshina Kali
Ramakrishna
Annapurna Temple, Titagarh
Ramakrishna and Swami Vivekananda relationship

Notes

References

External links

 Dakshineswar Kali temple

1855 establishments in India
Hindu temples in Kolkata
Ramakrishna
Kali temples
Shaktism
Tourist attractions in North 24 Parganas district